Cradoc railway station served the village of Cradoc, in the historical county of Breconshire, Wales, from 1877 to 1962 on the Neath and Brecon Railway.

History 
The station was opened on 1 March 1877, although it only appeared in Bradshaw in November 1877. It closed on 15 October 1962.

References

External links 

Disused railway stations in Powys
Railway stations in Great Britain opened in 1877
Railway stations in Great Britain closed in 1962
1877 establishments in Wales
1962 disestablishments in Wales